Nigel Barley may refer to:

 Nigel Barley (anthropologist) (born 1947), British anthropology writer
 Nigel Barley (cyclist) (born 1974), Australian Paralympic cyclist